Athrips albibasella is a moth of the family Gelechiidae. It is found in Namibia.

References

Endemic fauna of Namibia
Moths described in 2010
Athrips
Moths of Africa